Thaddeus Harold Brown (January 10, 1887 – February 25, 1941) was a Republican lawyer and politician from the U.S. State of Ohio.  After serving in the United States Army during World War I, he was elected Ohio Secretary of State 1923-1927, and was a commissioner of the Federal Radio Commission and then the Federal Communications Commission from 1932 to 1940.

Biography
Brown was born January 10, 1887, at Cardington, Morrow County, Ohio, son of William Henry Brown and Ella Dell (Monroe) Brown. He was married November 10, 1915, to Marie Thrailkill.

During World War I, Brown joined the United States Army and was Captain of Quartermaster Corps from July 13, 1917, and from October 11, 1918 until his discharge was Captain, Judge Advocate General's Corps at Fort Sam Houston, Texas.

In 1920, Brown was post Commander of American Legion in Columbus, Ohio. He was elected Ohio Secretary of State in 1922 and 1924, serving 1923-1927.

Brown was an unsuccessful candidate in the Republican primary for Ohio Governor in 1926, a delegate to the 1928 Republican National Convention, and a Presidential elector in 1928.

March 28, 1932, Brown was appointed to the Federal Radio Commission, and served until being appointed to the successor agency. On July 11, 1934, he was appointed a Commissioner to the newly formed Federal Communications Commission and served until June 30, 1940.

Brown died in Cleveland, Ohio, February 25, 1941, and was buried in Arlington National Cemetery. He was a Presbyterian, Mason, Phi Kappa Psi, Phi Delta Phi, and Shriner.

References

External links

1887 births
1941 deaths
Politicians from Columbus, Ohio
Ohio Republicans
Secretaries of State of Ohio
Members of the Federal Radio Commission
Members of the Federal Communications Commission
United States Army personnel of World War I
People from Cardington, Ohio
Burials at Arlington National Cemetery
1928 United States presidential electors
20th-century American politicians
Lawyers from Columbus, Ohio
Franklin D. Roosevelt administration personnel